"Bring It On Home to Me" is a song by American soul singer Sam Cooke, released on May 8, 1962, by RCA Victor. Produced by Hugo & Luigi, and arranged and conducted by René Hall, the song was the B-side to "Having a Party".  The song peaked at number two on Billboard Hot R&B Sides chart, and also charted at number 13 on the Billboard Hot 100.
The song has become a pop standard, covered by numerous artists of different genres. It is one of The Rock and Roll Hall of Fame's 500 Songs that Shaped Rock and Roll.

Background
"Bring It On Home to Me", like its B-side, "Having a Party", was written while Cooke was on tour for Henry Wynn. The song was initially offered to fellow singer Dee Clark, who turned it down. While in Atlanta, Cooke called co-producer Luigi Creatore and pitched both numbers; Creatore liked the songs, and booked a recording session in Los Angeles, scheduled for two weeks later. The session's mood "matched the title" of the song, according to biographer Peter Guralnick, as many friends had been invited. "It was a very happy session," recalled engineer Al Schmitt. "Everybody was just having a ball. We were getting people out there [on the floor], and some of the outtakes were hilarious, there was so much ad lib that went on." René Hall assembled an eighteen-piece backing group, "composed of six violins, two violas, two cellos, and a sax, plus a seven-piece rhythm section that included two percussionists, two bassists, two guitars, and a piano."

The song is a significant reworking of Charles Brown's 1959 single "I Want to Go Home", and it retains the gospel flavor and call-and-response format; the song differs significantly in that its refrain ("Bring it to me, bring your sweet lovin', bring it on home to me") is overtly secular.  The song was the first serious nod to his gospel roots ("[He] felt that he needed more weight, that that light shit wouldn't sustain him," said J.W. Alexander). The song was aiming for a sound similar to Cooke's former group, the Soul Stirrers.  The original, unreleased first take includes vocals from Lou Rawls, J.W. Alexander, Fred Smith (former assistant A&R rep at Keen Records), and "probably" the Sims Twins. A second, final take leaves Lou Rawls as the only echoing voice.

Personnel
"Bring It On Home to Me" was recorded on April 26, 1962, at RCA Studio 1 in the Hollywood area of Los Angeles, California. The engineer present was Al Schmitt, and the session was conducted and arranged by René Hall. The musicians also recorded "Having a Party" the same day. Credits adapted from the liner notes to the 2003 compilation Portrait of a Legend: 1951–1964.

Sam Cooke – vocals
Lou Rawls – backing vocals
Clifton White – guitar
Tommy Tedesco – guitar
René Hall – guitar
Adolphus Asbrook – bass guitar
Ray Pohlman – bass guitar
Ernie Freeman – piano
Frank Capp – drums, percussion
William Green – saxophone

Cecil Figelski – cello
Armand Kaproff – cello
Wilbert Nuttycombe – viola
Irving Weinper – viola
Myron Sandler – violin
Joseph Saxon – violin
Ralph Schaeffer – violin
Marshall Sosson – violin
Elliot Fisher – violin
Marvin Limonick – violin

Cover versions

The most significant cover versions of the song include versions by:
 The Big Three, 1964 single, Decca Records – the first British cover of the song
 The Animals in 1965 as a single, recorded in tribute to the then-recently killed Cooke. It was their last single to include original organist Alan Price. Their version reached number 7 in the UK and number 32 on the US Hot 100.  Cash Box said it's performed in "an effective funky, emotion-packed style."
 Otis Redding and Carla Thomas on their 1967 album King & Queen. John Lennon once said it was his favorite version of the song.
 Eddie Floyd's cover version hit number 4 on the R&B charts and number 17 on the Hot 100 in 1968 as a single from his 1968 studio album I've Never Found a Girl.
 Rod Stewart released this song in 1974 as part of a medley with "You Send Me" and charted it on the UK Singles Chart at number 7 as a double A-side with "Farewell".
 John Lennon covered the song on his Rock 'n' Roll album in 1975. He first heard the song in Liverpool in his early 20s, and liked the song very much, jamming to it frequently. He was hesitant to release his interpretation following so closely on the heels of versions by Dave Mason and Rod Stewart.
 Jamaican singer Johnny Clarke had local success with his cover version in 1976.
 Mickey Gilley hit number one on the country chart in 1976 with his cover version single taken from his 1976 studio album Gilley's Smokin'''.  He also reached number 101 on the Billboard Pop chart.
 The Chicks stripped the song down to vocals, finger snaps and plucked bass fiddle in 1990 on the album Thank Heavens for Dale Evans. Their version, less than two minutes long, revealed their blues-style harmonies.

Charts and certifications
Original version

The Animals version

Eddie Floyd version

Lou Rawls version

Mickey Gilley version

Year-end charts

In popular culture
The song was featured in the second to last scene of 1987 movie, "Adventures in Babysitting."

Green Day lifted the song's melody for the verses of their song "Brutal Love."

The song was featured in the 2017 film Guardians of the Galaxy Vol. 2''.

The film Gerald's Game features the song during the opening scene.

The song is featured in a 2018 Walmart Christmas commercial about a teddy bear that wanders the store's aisles at night until he's brought home to a little girl for Christmas.

The TV show Ozark featured the song in episode 1 of season 4, during the pool scene with Ruth, Jonah and Wyatt at the Lazy-O.
Also in season 4 episode 14. (A hard way to go)

References

1962 singles
Sam Cooke songs
Rhythm and blues songs
Lou Rawls songs
Mickey Gilley songs
Songs written by Sam Cooke
1962 songs
Song recordings produced by Hugo & Luigi
Song recordings produced by Eddie Kilroy
Soul ballads
RCA Victor singles
Decca Records singles
Columbia Graphophone Company singles
Playboy Records singles
1960s ballads